Urban Investment Partners is company that develops apartments in Washington D.C. The company was founded in 1999 by Steve Schwat and Wout Couster. In 2019 and 2020, tenants of a building owned by Urban Investment Partners launched a rent strike to protest mold, lead, poor maintenance, and other problems with the building. The company initiated eviction proceedings against the non-paying tenants.

Perdomo National Wrecking Company sued the company in 2018 for $221,000, alleging that Urban did not make "timely and complete payments" for work performed. In January, 2020, Edge Commercial sued Urban Investment Partners for breach of contract. As of May, 2020, the company had not issued rent relief to tenants affected by the COVID-19 pandemic.

History
Urban Investment Partners originally specialized in acquiring and renovating brick buildings subject to rent control. The company developed or invested in the following properties:
 Hall on Virginia Avenue in Foggy Bottom
 3 buildings near American University in Tenleytown
 The TRIBECA in NoMa
 Policy, a 62-unit apartment community in Kalorama.
 Onyx on First in the Capitol Riverfront business improvement district
 3333 Wisconsin Ave NW in Cleveland Park
 1483 Newton St NW in Columbia Heights
 Frequency Apartments in Tenleytown

References

External links
 

1999 establishments in Washington, D.C.
Real estate companies based in Washington, D.C.
Real estate companies established in 1999
Real estate companies of the United States